Kevin Francis Meates (20 February 1930 – 17 April 2022) was a New Zealand rugby union player. A flanker, sometimes playing at lock, Meates represented  at a provincial level. He was a member of the New Zealand national side, the All Blacks, in 1952, appearing in two internationals for the All Blacks against the touring Australian team in 1952.

Meates was the younger brother of Bill Meates, another rugby player, and uncle of David Meates (his brother Bill's son). He graduated from Canterbury University College with a Bachelor of Science in 1952.

Meates died in Christchurch on 17 April 2022, at the age of 92.

References

1930 births
2022 deaths
Canterbury rugby union players
New Zealand international rugby union players
New Zealand rugby union players
People educated at St Bede's College, Christchurch
Rugby union flankers
Rugby union locks
Rugby union players from Greymouth
University of Canterbury alumni
People educated at John Paul II High School, Greymouth